The 1988 Swedish motorcycle Grand Prix was the thirteenth round of the 1988 Grand Prix motorcycle racing season. It took place on the weekend of 12–14 August 1988 at the Anderstorp circuit.

500 cc race report
Eddie Lawson on pole. Wayne Rainey gets the start from Niall Mackenzie and Didier De Radiguès.

At the end of the first lap it's Rainey, Lawson, Wayne Gardner, Christian Sarron, De Radiguès, et al. Lawson passes 3 riders on the straight as if he's angry for his performance at Donington.

Lawson soon through on Rainey and gets a large lead on a group with Gardner, now in 2nd and Rainey in 3rd.

Lawson almost highsides out of first place, but keeps it together to the end. Rainey fades to 5th.

500cc classification

References

Swedish motorcycle Grand Prix
Swedish
Motorcycle
Swedish Grand Prix